Tarata is a city in the Tacna Region in southern Peru. It is the capital of Tarata District and Tarata Province.

History

Pre-Inca Era
The works of the archaeologist Rogger Ravines in the Karu cave show a very early settlement of Tarata, around 7000 BC, that is, more or less 9000 years ago. The study of regional cultural development over time is a task that Archeology has yet to develop. Not much is known of Tarata's remote past. The archaeologist Ravines found an Archaic settlement at the site of Kano, high up in the Tarata district, not far from their present city. The petroglyphs and cave paintings stand out in the province of Tarata, for this remote period.

Spanish Era
In 1611 work began on the temple of San Benedicto Abad, patron of the city of Tarata, thus beginning the process of evangelization of the area and in turn the process of acculturation and conversion of the indigenous populations. The temple was officially inaugurated on January 3, 1741, the same day that the Spanish foundation of the city took place.

Republican Era
In 1824, Simón Bolivar decrees the political creation of the district of Tarata, with President Manuel Pardo promulgating decades later the creation of the province of Tarata, on November 12, 1874, as well as its districts: Estike, Tarukachi, Tarata, Tikako and Kandarave.

Occupation by Chile
After the Battle of Tacna, and the subsequent retreat of Peruvian and Bolivian forces, the city was occupied by Chile, beginning a process of Chileanization. In 1911, the city was officially incorporated into the Chilean Province of Tacna as the Department of Tarata, with Tarata becoming the commune of the homonymous Department. In 1921, however, Chile abolished the department, and in 1925 gave back the city to Peru under the mediation of U.S. President Calvin Coolidge, who enforced the limits agreed upon on the north, which did not include the city.

Demographics
According to the 2007 Peru Census, The city of Tarata had 2,882 inhabitants, of which 2,577 speak Spanish as their native language, this being the most widely spoken language, followed by Aymara with 840 speakers. The predominant age group is children between 10 and 14 years old.

Geography
The region is located below the Titicaca plateau and has a diverse geography, including volcanoes, deserts, and mountainous zones, from which arise rivers that go over the punas and the plateaus, thus forming the hydrographical system of this zone. The region is small in size but has a significant mining and agriculture potential. It has various climates and diverse production.

Climate
The average climate per year is 8.6°C (47.5°F).

See also
 Tarata District
 Tacna Department

Notes

References

Populated places in the Tacna Region